Ioscytus is a genus of shore bugs in the family Saldidae. There are about seven described species in Ioscytus.

Species
These seven species belong to the genus Ioscytus:
 Ioscytus beameri (Hodgden, 1949)
 Ioscytus chapmani McKinnon & J. Polhemus, 1986
 Ioscytus cobbeni J. Polhemus, 1964
 Ioscytus franciscanus (Drake, 1949)
 Ioscytus nasti Drake & Hottes, 1955
 Ioscytus politus (Uhler, 1877)
 Ioscytus tepidarius (Hodgden, 1949)

References

Further reading

 
 

Articles created by Qbugbot
Heteroptera genera
Saldoidini